Carlos Alberto Lavado Jones (born May 25, 1956) is a Venezuelan former professional Grand Prix motorcycle racer. He competed in the FIM motorcycle Grand Prix world championships from 1978 to 1992. Lavado is notable for winning two 250cc road racing world championships in 1983 and 1986. He joins Johnny Cecotto as the only two Venezuelans to win Grand Prix World Championships.



Motorcycle racing career
Born in Caracas, Venezuela, Lavado made his international racing debut in the 1978 Venezuelan Grand Prix, finishing second in the 250cc class. The following season, he won the 350cc class at the 1979 Venezuelan Grand Prix.

In 1980, he began competing full-time on the Grand Prix circuit. He went on to win the 250cc World Championship in 1983 and repeated the feat in 1986, both times on Yamaha TZ250s. At the 1983 Dutch TT, Lavado and Iván Palazzese finished in first and second place marking the first time that Venezuelan riders had claimed the top two places in a world championship Grand Prix race.

In fifteen seasons of Grand Prix competition (1978–1992), he participated in 137 races, 125 of them in the 250cc division. He had 36 podium finishes and 17 victories in the 250cc class and 6 podium finishes with 2 victories in the 350cc division. After he retired from competition, he continued his involvement in Grand Prix racing serving as advisor to Venezuelan motorcycle racers Robertino Pietri and Gabriel Ramos.

Motorcycle Grand Prix Results
Points system from 1969 to 1987:

Points system from 1988 to 1992:

(key) (Races in bold indicate pole position; races in italics indicate fastest lap)

References 

Venezuelan motorcycle racers
250cc World Championship riders
350cc World Championship riders
Sportspeople from Caracas
1956 births
Living people
250cc World Riders' Champions